Felip Comabella i Guimet (May 13, 1841 in Montargull – May 9, 1901 in Barcelona) was a very well-known pharmacist. In 1885 he presented products developed by himself in the Exposition in Anwerp, 1885, and he obtained a gold medal. In 1895 he joined the Royal Academy of Medicine of Catalonia. He had also been nominated commander and knight of the Order of Isabella the Catholic. He had married Concepció Maluqer i Porta.

He opened the Comabella Drugstore at the house of Epifani de Fortuny, at the Carme street number 23, constructed in 1851 by Francesc Daniel Molina i Casamajó, one of the best architects of that time. The drugstore was inherited by his son, Joan Comabella i Maluquer, Biological Sciences bachelor and doctorate in Pharmacy in 1897. He married another Maluuqer, Josefina Maluquer Anzizu, daughter of Eduard Maluquer i Tirrell, president of the Diputació (1886/90), parliamentary and senator.

The Comabella Drugstore was reconstructed at the beginning of the twentieth century by the architect Guillem Busquets i Vautravens, and became one of the best known  modernist buildings in Barcelona. There was still another Comabella in charge of the drugstore, Manuel Comabella i Maluquer, grandson of the Comabella born in Montargull, who finally sold the drugstore in 1946.

References

Bibliography 
 

People from Catalonia